The Max Holste MH.20 was a French single-engined racing aircraft built to compete in the 1939 Coupe Deutsch de la Meurthe air race but not flying until 1941. A single example was built.

Design and development
In January 1939, the 26-year-old aircraft designer Max Holste began work at l'École de Réèducation Professionnelle, a Paris technical school for training the unemployed for work in the aviation industry, to design an all-metal single-engined racing aircraft. The design, intended to compete in the 1939 Coupe Deutsch de la Meurthe air race, was a mid-winged monoplane with a fixed tailwheel undercarriage. An enclosed cockpit was provided for the aircraft's pilot, situated behind the wing. The planned power-plant was a Béarn vertically-opposed air-cooled twelve-cylinder engine.

The airframe was effectively complete by June 1939, with only the engine awaited, with it being hoped that the aircraft would make its maiden flight by August 1939. This did not occur, however, and the aircraft did not fly until 25 July 1941, powered by a Régnier air-cooled inverted 12Hoo V12 engine.

Specifications

References

Racing aircraft
1940s French sport aircraft
Max Holste aircraft
Single-engined tractor aircraft
Mid-wing aircraft
Aircraft first flown in 1941